Williams Arcade's Greatest Hits is a video game anthology for the Super Nintendo Entertainment System, PlayStation, Sega Genesis, Saturn, Game.com, Dreamcast, MS-DOS, and Microsoft Windows. The IBM PC compatible and game.com versions are titled Williams Arcade Classics. The 2000 release Midway's Greatest Arcade Hits Vol. 1 contains much of the same content.

Gameplay
The anthology includes emulated arcade games originally released by Williams Electronics between 1981 and 1983:

Defender
Defender II
Joust
Robotron: 2084
Sinistar
Bubbles (only on Saturn, PlayStation, IBM PC compatibles, Dreamcast)
Also included on some versions are bonus materials, video clips, and concept arts, along with access to the original debug menus.

Reception

The PlayStation version received overwhelmingly positive reviews. Critics for Electronic Gaming Monthly, GamePro, and Maximum all praised the arcade-perfect emulation of the games and the strong selection, generally concurring that all of the included games except Bubbles are classics which remain immensely fun. Mark Lefebyre of EGM called it "a grand compilation that takes you back to what games are meant to be... fun." GamePro concluded that "If you're into retro gaming, this compilation of six early-'80s coin-op titles is a true collectible." Maximum declared, "All of the games (bar the easily forgettable Bubbles) remain incredibly playable and provide a super-stiff challenge that puts a great deal of the current crop of PlayStation titles to shame."

Reviewing the PC version, Next Generation said the compilation contains "arcade-perfect" conversions of "the arcade games that made this industry what it is today", particularly praising the retention of the bugs, which the reviewer felt were among the best features of the arcade originals. He was also pleased with the settings modes and multimedia bonus material, and concluded, "If you're into the retro trip, you can't do better than this disc." Next Generation reviewed the PC version of the game, rating it three stars out of five, and stated that "These games are fun to play, but only for about a half hour. After that, the urge for Warcraft 2 will most certainly win out over Robotron." Rich Leadbetter gave the Saturn version a strong recommendation in Sega Saturn Magazine, saying that the gameplay design, originality, and challenge of all the included games had held up well. Unlike most of the compilation's reviewers, he argued that Bubbles, though obscure, is solidly entertaining.

Reviews for the Genesis version were more mixed. The four reviewers of Electronic Gaming Monthly were enthusiastic about the genuinely arcade-perfect conversions and enjoyed the games, but questioned why this version took so long to come out and why Bubbles had been omitted. Sushi-X pointed out that due to the existence of the Genesis Nomad, the Genesis version was the first portable version of the games in the collection. GamePro criticized the compilation's lack of extras as compared to Namco Museum, and opined that the games are "average". However, they singled out Robotron: 2084 as the best of the five "with its swarming enemies that create genuine suspense."

Brett Alan Weiss of AllGame rated the game.com version three stars out of five and wrote, "Considering the inherent limitations of a black-and-white handheld system, the designers of Williams Arcade Classics for the game.com did about as good a job as could be expected with this compilation. [...] The games look a lot like the originals, but much of the animation is choppy. The sound effects are incredibly faithful to the source material." Weiss also stated that the game.com version "does a hit-and-miss job of cramming five all-time greats into one tiny cartridge. [...] The most impressive thing about this collection is its loud and proud sound effects."

References

1996 video games
PlayStation (console) games
Sega Genesis games
Sega Saturn games
Super Nintendo Entertainment System games
Game.com games
Midway video game compilations
Video games developed in the United States
Digital Eclipse games